Partido is a town in the Dajabón province of the Dominican Republic.

Sources 
 – World-Gazetteer.com

Populated places in Dajabón Province
Municipalities of the Dominican Republic